Sasanian dress (Middle Persian: ǰāmag or paymōg), represented by the Persians, was "broadly similar" to dresses worn by other Iranian peoples. It was especially appropriate and applicable for horse riding. Most extant primary sources for the study of Sasanian dress are forms of visual art, rock reliefs in particular. In relation to the Sasanian dress, Matthew Canepa (2018) states:

According to Elsie H. Peck (1992), scholars have been hampered in their research on Sasanian female dress due to the scarcity of extant material (i.e. representations) compared to male Sasanian dress.

See also
 Central Asian clothing
 Korymbos (headgear)
 Persian clothing
 Parthian dress
 Tocharian clothing
 Byzantine dress
 Tzangion

References

Sources
 
 

Sasanian Empire
Iranian clothing